Walter White (15 May 1882 – 8 July 1950) was a Scottish professional footballer who played as an inside forward in the Football League for Bolton Wanderers, Fulham and Everton. He won two caps for Scotland at international level.

Personal life
White was married with three children. He served as a gunner in the Royal Garrison Artillery during the First World War and was gassed in 1918.

Career statistics

Honours 
Bolton Wanderers

 Football League Second Division second-place promotion: 1904–05

References

External links 

 

1882 births
1950 deaths
Scottish footballers
Scotland international footballers
Bolton Wanderers F.C. players
Everton F.C. players
Fulham F.C. players
English Football League players
Association football inside forwards
Association football wing halves
British Army personnel of World War I
Royal Garrison Artillery soldiers
FA Cup Final players
Military personnel from East Ayrshire